Polly Parsons (born 15 February 1984) is an English television presenter.

Early life
Parsons was born in Bristol, and attended Sacred Heart Convent Primary School and later Redland High School for Girls. She then gained A-Levels in Art, Drama and Dance and a Diploma in Performing Arts at Elmhurst School for Dance, Camberley.

Career
Parsons co-presented Fun Song Factory as Paige with Laura Hamilton. She also appeared as Princess Sapphire in Genie in the House, Toonattik, and played Crystal in Disastrous for Nickelodeon. Later, she starred in Don't Get Screwed for BBC Three, and as Becky in Meet the Parents on E4. She was a presenter on BBC Three's The Real Hustle in 2012.

Personal life
Parsons dated EastEnders actor Sid Owen for six years; the couple were engaged from 2009 to 2012. The same year she and Owen parted, followed by a brief relationship with insurance broker Thomas Needham, she began a relationship with footballer Thomas Vermaelen, with whom she has two sons, Raff and Ace. The couple married in June 2017.

References

1984 births
Living people
Television personalities from Bristol
People educated at Redland High School for Girls
People educated at the Elmhurst School for Dance
English television presenters